The 1992 Russian Indoor Athletics Championships was the 1st edition of the national championship in indoor track and field for Russia. It was held on 18–20 January at the VGAFK Stadium in Volgograd. A total of 29 events (15 for men and 14 for women) were contested over the three-day competition, with the pole vault being the additional event available to men only. 

The Russian Indoor Championships replaced the Soviet Indoor Athletics Championships for Russian athletes, as a result of the dissolution of the Soviet Union the previous year. The competition was ignored by many leading Russian athletes. This was due to the separate 1992 CIS Indoor Athletics Championships held in Moscow a month later, which was chosen as the Russian qualifying meet for the 1992 European Athletics Indoor Championships.

Results

Men

Women

References

На стадионах страны и мира. Чемпионат России // Лёгкая атлетика : журнал. — 1992. — № 3. — С. 30. 

Russian Indoor Athletics Championships
Russian Indoor Athletics Championships
Russian Indoor Athletics Championships
Russian Indoor Athletics Championships
Sports competitions in Volgograd